Forest Hill is an unincorporated community in Le Flore County, Oklahoma, United States.

References

Unincorporated communities in Le Flore County, Oklahoma
Unincorporated communities in Oklahoma
Fort Smith metropolitan area